"To Love a Woman" is a song by American singer Lionel Richie, featuring vocals from Spanish singer Enrique Iglesias. It was written by Richie, Iglesias and Paul Barry for Richie's live album Encore (2002), while production was helmed by Mark Taylor along with co-producers Ric Wake and Richie Jones. The song was released as the album's first and only single in Europe where it became a top ten hit in Belgium and entered the top 20 in Switzerland and United Kingdom. "To Love a Woman" was later also included on the 2002 re-issue of Iglesias' fifth studio album, Escape (2001).

Track listings

Notes
 signifies a co-producer

Charts

References

Lionel Richie songs
Enrique Iglesias songs
2003 singles
Songs written by Paul Barry (songwriter)
Songs written by Lionel Richie
Songs written by Enrique Iglesias